Francesco (Franz Wilhelm) Rabaliatti (20 January 1716 – 1782) was a German architect and Court Builder to the Prince-elector Karl Theodor. 

Rabaliatti was born in Gameragna di Stella. His teacher was Alessandro Galli da Bibiena. 

He made a substantial contribution to the planning and construction of the Mannheimer Schloss and with Bibiena he began the construction of the Jesuit Church at Mannheim

Together with Johann Lacher between 1772 and 1774, he built the Mannheim Observatory (today: "The old observatory")  for the Jesuit mathematician and court astronomer Christian Mayer. It is a classical five storied octagonal tower. Today it houses an artists studio.

In Heidelberg he designed the " Carolinum " (University of Heidelberg), which was completed in 1765.  The baroque Jesuit Church was started in 1711 by Johann Adam Breunig and completed in 1759 by Rabaliatti. The tower was built between 1868 and 1872. 

Following the plans of Bibiena between 1750 and 1755, Rabaliatta, together with Guillaume d'Hauberat, built the southern circular buildings and the Orangery at  Schwetzingen Schloss .  In the town of Schwetzingen he also built several houses, including his own home, and Palais Hirsch (the Deer Palace).

In 1754/55 he built a baroque church in Mutterstadt for a construction cost of 2580 Guilders, which was extensively restored between 1977 and 1980. In addition in 1756 he produced the drawings for the restoration of the gate tower of Dilsberg. In 1757 he planned the renovation of the local church in Pleisweiler (re-renovated in 1957).

Rabaliatti and Nicolas de Pigage conducted many joint projects but were also competitors.

1716 births
1782 deaths
18th-century German architects
People from Savona